Pandavulu means Pandavas in Telugu language.
 Mana Voori Pandavulu is a 1978 Telugu film. 
 Kaliyuga Pandavulu is a 1986 Telugu film. 
 Pandavulu Pandavulu Tummeda is a 2014 Telugu film.